Cabbage white or cabbage butterfly may refer to:

 Pieris brassicae, a Palearctic butterfly
 Pieris rapae, a Palearctic butterfly that has been introduced to many other parts of the world